"Kokoro no Ato" (ココロの跡 Heart's Mark or Heart's Scar) is Riyu Kosaka's fifth single with Avex and her sixth single overall. It was released on December 12, 2007. Unlike her previous singles with Avex, this single did not ship with a CD+DVD edition. The title track is featured as the intro theme to the anime Mokke.

CD Side
 ココロの跡 (Kokoro no Ato Heart's Mark or Heart's Scar)
 Yes or No
 ココロの跡 (instrumental)
 Yes or No (instrumental)

Single details

Performed by 
 Riyu Kosaka

Lyrics by 
 Riyu Kosaka

Sources 

2007 singles
Riyu Kosaka songs
2007 songs